The Electoral district of Waratah was a single-member electoral district of the Tasmanian House of Assembly. It centred on the town of Waratah in western Tasmania.

The seat was created in a redistribution ahead of the 1897 election from the southern part of the Wellington electorate, which had been a two-member seat until the election. The seat was abolished when the Tasmanian parliament adopted the Hare-Clark electoral model in 1909. Its final member, John Earle, successfully stood for the multi-member seat of Franklin and, shortly after the 1909 election, became Tasmania's the first Labor premier, albeit of an unstable minority government which lasted a week. He regained the Premiership in 1914 and held it for two years, before gaining a seat in the Australian Senate.

Members for Waratah

References
 
 
 Parliament of Tasmania (2006). The Parliament of Tasmania from 1956

Waratah